This is a list of notable hospitals in Nebraska (U.S. state).  In 2022, there were a total of 110 active hospitals in Nebraska with a combined number of license beds of over 6,944.

Hospitals 

The following list shows active hospitals by city and type of hospital.  There are links to articles on the most notable hospitals.  The largest hospital in the state is the University of Nebraska Medical Center has 718 staffed beds and was founded in 1917. The oldest hospital, Creighton University Medical Center was found in 1870 and has 396 beds on its main campus. The number of beds are include in this table for hospitals with 50 or more licensed beds in 2022.

Healthcare systems in Nebraska 

 Bryan Health
 CHI Health
 Indian Health Service
 MercyOne
 Nebraska Methodist Health System
 Rural Nebraska Healthcare Network
 Veterans Health Administration

References

External links 

 
 

Nebraska

Hospitals